Fred Gibson or Frederick Gibson may refer to:

 Fred Gibson (American football) (born 1981), former wide receiver and former basketball guard
 Fred Gibson (cricketer) (1912–2013), Jamaican-born English cricketer
 Fred Gibson (golfer) (born 1947), American golfer
 Fred Gibson (racing driver) (born 1941), former Australian racing driver and race team owner
 Frederick Gibson (footballer) (born 1907), English footballer
 Fred Gibson (soccer, born 1888) (1888–1952), South African footballer
 Frederick E. Gibson (born 1935), Canadian judge
 Fred L. Gibson (1874–1956), Associate Justice of the Montana Supreme Court
 Fred Gibson (record producer), a British singer and remixer

See also
 Fred Gipson (1908–1973), American author